The 1988 Duke Blue Devils football team represented the Duke Blue Devils of Duke University during the 1988 NCAA Division I-A football season.

Schedule

Personnel

Awards and honors
 Anthony Dilweg, ACC Offensive Player of Year
 Steve Spurrier, ACC Coach of Year

References

Duke
Duke Blue Devils football seasons
Duke Blue Devils football